Haninge Municipality (Haninge kommun) is a municipality in Stockholm County in east central Sweden. Its seat is located in Handen, a part of the Stockholm urban area.

Haninge Municipality was formed in 1971 when Västerhaninge and Österhaninge were united.

The municipal coat of arms depicts a capercaillie from which the name Haninge is believed to have been derived (the German word hahn means capercaillie), while the anchor symbolizes the naval base in the municipality. The German word usage is supposedly from the old German Hansa traders who operated in the area.

Geography 

Haninge cherishes its nature, housing the southern parts of the scenic Stockholm archipelago. There are over 3,600 islands, islets and skerries belonging to the municipality, with the three largest islands being Utö, Ornö and Muskö. A car tunnel, the third longest in Sweden, connects Muskö to the mainland. The other two of the islands are reached with passenger and car ferries. Haninge is also an area with access to Tyresta National Park with a surrounding nature reserve. It has been protected to preserve its noted natural values, e.g. one of the largest sections of untouched forest in southern Sweden.

Localities 
Dalarö
Stockholm (part of)
Jordbro
Muskö
Västerhaninge

Districts 
Brandbergen
Dalarö
Handen
Jordbro

Sågen
Vega

Vendelsömalm
Västerhaninge

Demographics

Residents with a foreign background 
On 31 December 2017 the number of people with a foreign background (persons born outside of Sweden or with two parents born outside Sweden) was 31 107, or 35.33% of the population (88 037 on 31 December 2017). On 31 December 2002 the number of residents with a foreign background was (per the same definition) 17 323, or 24.43% of the population (70 902 on 31 December 2002). On 31 December 2017 there were 88 037 residents in Haninge, of which 23 203 people (26.36%) were born in a country other than Sweden. Divided by country in the table below – the Nordic countries, as well as the 12 most common countries of birth outside of Sweden for Swedish residents, have been included, with other countries of birth bundled together by continent by Statistics Sweden.

Notability 
The scenic Stockholm Sweden Temple was built in Västerhaninge in 1985. It is the only temple of the Church of Jesus Christ of Latter-day Saints in Sweden. This temple is also the center of the LDS church in northern Europe.

There is a comparatively large Sweden-Finn community in Haninge which is estimated to be about 5% of the population.

The International Olympiad in Informatics (IOI) was held in Haninge in 1994.

Sports
The following sports clubs are located in Haninge Municipality:
 IFK Haninge/Brandbergen
 Haga Haninge Basket
 Vendelsö IK
 Haninge Anchors
 Haninge FBC

Notable people from Haninge Municipality 
 William Eklund (*2002), professional ice hockey player
 Kristian Huselius (*1978), professional ice hockey player
 Mattias Löw (*1970), film director and photographer
 Stefan Nystrand (*1981), freestyle swimmer
 Adam Pålsson (* 1988), actor
 Fredrik Reinfeldt (*1965), Prime Minister of Sweden from 17 September 2006 to 14 September 2014.
 Sarah Sjöström (*1993), freestyle swimmer
 Sara Skyttedal (*1986), Member of the European Parliament for Sweden
 Meeri Wasberg (*1973), politician

International relations
The municipality is twinned with:
 Ishøj Municipality, Denmark
 Haapsalu, Estonia
 Pargas, Finland
 Formia, Italy
 Krokom Municipality, Sweden
 Gračanica, Bosnia and Herzegovina

See also 
Björnö, Haninge

References

External links 

Haninge Municipality – Official site

Haninge Municipality
Municipalities of Stockholm County
Metropolitan Stockholm
Stockholm urban area